Digital Tape Format is a magnetic tape data storage format developed by Sony.  It uses a 1/2" wide tape, in a cassette with two reels, which is written and read with a helical scan process.  The format is described by the ECMA 248 (adopted June 1998) and ISO/IEC 15731 standards.  There are two sizes of tape cassettes, "S" and "L".

Generations 

Notes:
 Both used ALDC compression
 DTF-2 used Fibre Channel or SCSI interfaces
 The tape cassettes are similar to those of Sony Betacam.

External links 
 ECMA 248 Specification of DTF-1. 
 ECMA 315 Specification of DTF-2. 
 Brochure for DTF-1 drive with specs
 DTF at the Computer Desktop Encyclopedia, including images 

Computer storage tape media